List of The Great British Bake Off finalists may refer to:

 List of The Great British Bake Off finalists (series 1–7)
 List of The Great British Bake Off finalists (series 8–present)

See also
 List of The Great British Bake Off contestants
 List of The Great British Bake Off Star Bakers